Summers-Taylor Stadium is a college soccer-specific stadium located on the campus of East Tennessee State University in Johnson City, Tennessee, in the United States. The stadium is home to the East Tennessee State Buccaneers men's and women's soccer programs. The stadium opened in 2008 and sits 2,000 spectators.

The stadium will host a semifinal match in the 2020 Southern Conference Men's Soccer Tournament.

References

External links 
 Summers-Taylor Stadium

East Tennessee State Buccaneers soccer
Johnson City, Tennessee
Soccer venues in Tennessee
College soccer venues in the United States
Sports venues completed in 2008
2008 establishments in Tennessee